PTAT-1 was the first privately financed transatlantic fibre optic telecommunications cable, which was completed in 1989, at a cost of US$400 million.

The significance of PTAT-1 is that it broke the international telecommunication monopoly held by AT&T Corporation and British Telecom (BT) for telecommunications between the US and UK.

PTAT-1 was built by a joint venture of a small private US company, Private TransAtlantic Telecommunication System (PTAT Systems, founded as TelOptik in 1984) and Cable & Wireless plc of the UK.  The submarine cable system and line terminal equipment was provided by Standard Telephones and Cables (STC), and alarm and control system management by International Computers Limited (ICL). The US shore end was built by Lightwave Spectrum.

The UK to US section of the cable was shut down just after 02:00 hours on 8 February 2004, as it was no longer considered financially viable by Cable & Wireless.  Competitors to the cable had dropped their prices drastically after they re-emerged from Chapter 11 Bankruptcy with little or no debts to service, something C&W was unable to compete with.

This cable provided intelligent repeaters that counted bit errors which were reported in response to interrogation from a base station.  It contained three fibre pairs which were used to provide two active channels.  Each repeater included a base station-controlled cross-over data switch to swap traffic through a choice of two fibre pairs, the switch connections in successive repeaters enabled any desired connection to be made and provide a diversity path when required.

Transatlantic communications cables
Infrastructure completed in 1989
United Kingdom–United States relations
Ireland–United Kingdom relations
Ireland–United States relations
1989 establishments in New Jersey
1989 establishments in Bermuda
1989 establishments in Ireland
1989 establishments in England